Shulshaga (Šulšaga) or Shulsagana (Šulšagana) was a Mesopotamian god. He was a part of the state pantheon of the city-state of Lagash. His name means "youth of his heart" in Sumerian, with the possessive pronoun possibly referring to Shulshaga's father, Ningirsu. 

While direct references to the lineage of deities are rare in sources from the Early Dynastic period, it is certain that Shulshaga was viewed as the eldest son of Ningirsu and his wife Bau, and as the older brother of Igalim. One inscription refers to Shulshaga and Igalim as "beloved children of Ningirsu." They received an equal amount of offerings according to documents from Early Dynastic Lagash.

Several rulers of Lagash were devoted to Shulshaga. Ur-Nanshe built a statue of him. Urukagina mentions building temples to multiple deities of Lagash, including Shulsaga, as well as his parents, brother, as well as Hegir, Bau's Lamma and Ninmu. Said temple bore the name (E-)tuš-akkil-li.  One inscription of Gudea mentions him alongside Ningirsu and the king's tutelary god Ningishzida, and credits him with providing him with the "breath of life."

It is possible that in later periods Shulshaga was worshiped in Assur in Esharra, the temple of Ashur. Late lexical texts also sometimes apply the names Shulshaga and Igalim to the weapons of Zababa.

References

Bibliography

Mesopotamian gods